The 2022–23 Northeast Conference men's basketball season began with practices in October 2023, followed by the start of the 2022–23 NCAA Division I men's basketball season in November. Conference play started in January and ended in March 2023.

The NEC tournament was held in March with the higher-seeded team hosting each game.

Changes from last season
Stonehill College joined the Northeast Conference from the Division II Northeast-10 Conference. It is not eligible for the NCAA tournament until the 2026–27 season when its four-year reclassification period ends.

Bryant left the conference and joined the America East Conference.

Mount St. Mary's left the conference and joined the Metro Atlantic Athletic Conference (MAAC).

On March 25, FDU fired head coach Greg Herenda. On May 3, FDU hired Division II St. Thomas Aquinas head coach Tobin Anderson as his replacement.

On April 12, Wagner head coach Bashir Mason left Wagner to take the open head coaching position at Saint Peter's. On April 21, Wagner hired Seton Hall assistant coach Donald Copeland as his replacement.

Effective for the 2022–23 academic year, NEC teams transitioning from Division II are eligible for the NEC tournament during their third and fourth years of the transition period. If a reclassifying institution wins the NEC tournament championship, the conference's automatic bid to the NCAA tournament goes to the NEC tournament runner up. The rule change results in Merrimack being eligible for the 2023 NEC tournament, since it is in its fourth transition year, and Stonehill being eligible for the 2025 NEC tournament, when it will be in its third transition year.

LIU fired Derek Kellogg on June 30. Former NBA player Rod Strickland, who had been the director of the NBA G League's professional development program focusing on the exhibition team NBA G League Ignite, was named the new head coach that day.

Head coaches 

Notes: 
 All records, appearances, titles, etc. are from time with current school only. 
 Year at school includes 2022–23 season.
 Overall and NEC/NCAA records are from time at current school and are before the beginning of the 2022–23 season.
 Previous jobs are head coaching jobs unless otherwise noted.

Preseason

Preseason coaches poll
Source:

() first place votes

Preseason All-NEC team
Source:

NEC regular season

Season notes
On November 7, 2022, the season's opening night, Wagner overcame a 15-point deficit with seven minutes remaining to win at Temple, 76–73, in overtime. A three-point basket by Jahbril Price-Noel with three seconds remaining in regulation tied the game and sent it to overtime. Rahmir Moore's basket in overtime gave the Seahawks the lead, and the game was secured by two free throws by Price-Noel. Junior guard Delonnie Hunt led Wagner with 19 points.

Stonehill used a 7–1 run to close its game at Army West Point and earn an 82–77 victory on November 12, the Skyhawks' first win as a Division I program. Isaiah Burnett's jump shot in the final minute put Stonehill in front, 77–76, and they hit their free throws down the stretch to put the game away. The Skyhawks shot 52.% from the field and were led by Andrew Sims, who shot 9 for 11 and added eight rebounds and two blocked shots. Burnett had 19 points for Stonehill, and Thatcher Stone added 15.

On November 13, Nico Galette took control in the final minute of Sacred Heart's game against Columbia to lead them to an 88–85 victory. Galette's layup put the Pioneers in front, 86–85. Galette then forced a turnover on Columbia's next possession and hit two free throws to give Sacred Heart their three-point winning margin. He finished with 14 points and eight rebounds, and Mike Sixsmith had a career-high 23 points on 9 for 14 shooting.

St. Francis Brooklyn played its final game at the Daniel Lynch '38 Gymnasium within the Generoso Pope Athletic Complex, affectionately known as The Pope, their home court since 1971, on November 19. The Terriers surrendered an 18–0 run to Saint Peter's in the first half but came back and found themselves trailing by only five points, 63–58, when a Josiah Harris jump shot cut the deficit to three with 1:34 to play. A blocked shot by Roy Clarke led to a transition basket by Di'Andre Howell-South, that reduced the Saint Peter's lead to a single point. After another defensive stop, Zion Bethea’s reverse layup put St. Francis Brooklyn ahead, 59–58, with 37 seconds to play. A pair of free throws by Larry Moreno gave the Terriers a three-point cushion, and the Peacocks missed two three-point shots attempts in the closing seconds. Harris had his second-consecutive double-double, scoring 16 points with 13 rebounds and four blocked shots. Moreno scored a season-high 19 points, 14 of those in the second half on 6-for-8 shooting from the field, and he was 5 for 5 from the line. Through the season's first two weeks, Harris led the NEC in defensive rebounding rate at 34.7%.

On November 19, Stonehill overcame an 11-point second-half deficit at the Tom Konchalski Classic at Fordham University to defeat Holy Cross, 81–79. After the Skyhawks had taken a three-point lead, the Crusaders tied the game at 79 with 11 seconds to play. With Stonehill out of time outs, Josh Mack brought the ball up the court, backed into position in the paint, and hit a contested hook shot that banked in with 2.1 seconds remaining to give Stonehill the win. Mack scored a season-high 10 points, and had four rebounds, two assists and a blocked shot. Through five games over the season's first two weeks, the Skyhawks led the NEC in field goal percentage at 49.5%, effective field goal percentage at 56.6%, and free throw percentage at 83.7%. They were second in three-point field goal percentage 38.1%.

On November 21, Josh Cohen of Saint Francis (PA) became the first NEC player to score 40 points against a non-conference Division I opponent since December 2012, in an 82–76 loss to Lehigh. In setting a new career high, Cohen shot 15 for 19 from the floor and 10 for 13 from the free-throw line. He also had nine rebounds, three assists and a blocked shot. It was the first 40-point game for a Red Flash player since February 1991.

Despite the Skyhawks losing two of their three games at the Tom Konchalski Classic, two Stonehill players, Andrew Sims and Isaiah Burnett, were named to the All-Tournament team.

On November 27, Jahbril Price-Noel scored 19 points off the bench to lead Wagner to a 62–57 road win at NJIT.

Through the season's first three and four weeks, Stonehill led NCAA Division I in free-throw shooting percentage.

On December 3, Fairleigh Dickinson went on a 12–1 run that started with just over seven minutes remaining to extend their lead in a tight game at St. Joseph's to 81–68, on their wat to a 97–80 victory. Grant Singleton and Demetre Roberts each scored a season-high 24 points for the Knights, combining to shoot 15 for 22 from the field, 8 for 12 from three-point range and 10 for 10 from the free-throw line. Ansley Almonor scored 19 points for Fairleigh Dickinson. The Knights shot 57.6% from the floor and hit 12 of their 24 three-point attempts.

Josh Mack hit a three-pointer from the left wing at the buzzer off a pass from Cole Bergen to give Stonehill a dramatic 69–66 victory at Binghamton on December 3. The Skyhawks had a four-point lead with 18 seconds to play, only to see Binghamton tie the game with only five seconds remaining. However, without any timeouts, Stonehill was able to push the ball up the floor for the game-winning shot. Andrew Sims led the Skyhawks with 22 points.

Player of the week
Throughout the regular season, the Northeast Conference offices named player(s) of the week and rookie(s) of the week.

Against other conferences

Regular Season

Postseason

Conference matrix
This table summarizes the head-to-head results between teams in conference play.

All-NEC honors and awards
At the conclusion of the regular season, the conference selects outstanding performers based on a poll of league coaches. Below are the results.

Postseason

NEC tournament

Games were played between March 1 and 7, 2023, at campus sites. Teams were reseeded after each round with highest remaining seeds receiving home-court advantage. Merrimack won the tournament but was unable to represent the conference in the NCAA tournament, because it was still in transition from Division II. Instead, the conference's automatic bid to the tournament went to conference tournament runner-up, Fairleigh Dickinson. Ziggy Reid of Merrimack was named the tournament's MVP.

NCAA tournament

See also
2022–23 Northeast Conference women's basketball season

References

External links
NEC website